The Miss Costa Rica 2009 was held on March 27, 2009. Nine contestants entered, each representing a province and national capital. The pageant was held in the capital city. The location was The Auditorio del Museo de los Niños de Costa Rica. Jessica Umaña, representing the National Capital, was crowned the winner. Umaña, who stands 1.75 m tall, was one of the favorites for the title. This was her second try at the crown (she had competed in Miss Costa Rica 2008, but withdrew before the finals took place). She decided to try again, winning the title over 8 other contestants. The winner will enter Miss Universe 2009, Reina Hispanoamericana 2009 and Miss Continente Americano 2009. The first runner up will enter Miss World 2009 and Miss Tourism Queen International 2009. The second runner up will enter Miss International 2009 and Miss Intercontinental 2009. The third runner up will enter Miss Earth 2009 and  Reinado Internacional del Café 2009.

Results

Special awards

Best Smile - Karol Quirós (Alajuela)
Best in Swimsuit - Jessica Umaña (Distrito Capital)
Best Provincial Costume - Karol Castro (Limón)
Miss Congeniality - Jessica Umaña (Distrito Capital)
Miss Photogenic - Nancy Montero (Heredia)
Best Face - Nancy Montero (Heredia)
Best Hair - Nancy Montero (Heredia)
Best Model - Karol Quirós (Alajuela)
Miss Communication - Lucía Cascante (Puntarenas)

Candidates

External links
Candidatas MCR '09

Beauty pageants in Costa Rica